NCCC Mall Tagum  is the second mall built by NCCC Group and the oldest mall located in Tagum City in the Philippines. The mall opened in 2000. The mall also caters to neighboring towns of Tagum City.

On January 16, 2016, an incident occurred; a group of 9 people attempted to rob two jewelry shops within the mall.

See also
Gaisano

References 

Shopping malls in the Philippines
Buildings and structures in Tagum
Commercial buildings completed in 2000
2000 establishments in the Philippines
20th-century architecture in the Philippines